Len Weekley (21 July 1922 – 7 June 2008) was an Australian cricketer. He played in six first-class matches for South Australia between 1950 and 1957.

See also
 List of South Australian representative cricketers

References

External links
 

1922 births
2008 deaths
Australian cricketers
South Australia cricketers
Cricketers from Adelaide